The 1961 ICF Canoe Slalom World Championships were held in Hainsberg, East Germany under the auspices of International Canoe Federation. It was the 7th edition. The women's folding K1 team event was not held at these championships after taking place in the previous one.

Medal summary

Men's

Canoe

Kayak

Mixed

Canoe

Women's

Kayak

Medals table

References

External links
International Canoe Federation

Icf Canoe Slalom World Championships, 1961
ICF Canoe Slalom World Championships
International sports competitions hosted by East Germany
Icf Canoe Slalom World Championships, 1961